Philip Martin or Phillip Martin may refer to:

 Phillip Martin (1926–2010), Native American political leader
 Phillip Martin (artist) (1927–2014) painter working with collage and sculpture
 Philip Martin (director) (active from 2000), British television and film director
 Philip Martin (Neighbours), a fictional character on the Australian soap opera Neighbours
 Philip Martin (pianist) (born 1947), Irish composer and pianist
 Philip Martin (poet) (1931–2005), Australian poet
 Philip Martin (screenwriter) (1938–2020), English screenwriter on the science fiction show Doctor Who
 Phillip Martin III (born 1968), American rapper and producer
 Phil Martin (boxer) (1950–1994), English boxer
 Phil Martin (basketball) (1928–2008), guard in the National Basketball Association
 Phil Martin (highland games) (born 1964),  former professional strongman and highland games competitor
 Philip Wykeham Martin (1829–1878), British Member of Parliament for Rochester, 1856–1878
 Phillip W. Martin (born 1948), Kansas state legislator

See also
 Philippe Martin (disambiguation)